In mathematics in the branch of differential geometry, the cocurvature of a connection on a manifold is the obstruction to the integrability of the vertical bundle.

Definition
If M is a manifold and P is a connection on M, that is a vector-valued 1-form on M which is a projection on TM such that PabPbc = Pac, then the cocurvature  is a vector-valued 2-form on M defined by 

where X and Y are vector fields on M.

See also
Curvature
Lie bracket
Frölicher-Nijenhuis bracket

Differential geometry
Curvature (mathematics)